Jerzy Pietrkiewicz or Peterkiewicz (29 September 1916 – 26 October 2007) was a Polish poet, novelist, translator, and literary critic who spent much of his life in British exile.

Life

He was born in Fabianki, Poland, the son of a well-read peasant, Jan Pietrkiewicz, and a woman of aristocratic descent, Antonina Politowska, who was about fifty years old at his birth. Both his parents died while he was still a child, his mother of cancer when he was twelve, and his father two years later. He attended the Jan Długosz Catholic School in Włocławek, and then went to Warsaw to study journalism. His first published writing was poetry in Okolica Poetów in 1934. He also contributed articles to ultra-nationalist newspapers.

The left-wing poet and literary critic Ignacy Fik (19041942), in his history of Polish literature during the Interbellum, will reserve a special mention for the "horrific poems of Pietrkiewicz", published in the "Prosto z mostu" magazine, in which the "national myth" receives its "racist" incarnation.

His Wiersze o dzieciństwie ("Poems about Childhood"; 1935) did not receive any accolades from the critics in general; Kazimierz Andrzej Jaworski writing in the literary journal Kamena observed that the compositions included in the collection "bore the reader with their monotony", and if they have any value "it is only apparent to the author himself, for they ring hollow to others".

During World War II he fled first to France and then to Britain. On his arrival he knew no English. He attended the University of St Andrews, earning by 1944 a master's degree in English literature, and in 1948 he completed a doctorate at King's College London, where he would go on to teach Polish language and literature.

He began writing novels in English in 1953, reserving Polish for his poetical works. His novels were successful, and led to a friendship with Muriel Spark. On the accession of Pope John Paul II, Pietrkiewicz translated his poems into English, and as a result his own work became known in Poland. He was awarded the Prize of the Ministry of Culture and Art in 1987.

He was married twice, first to Danuta Karel, a Polish actress, and then to Christine Brooke-Rose. Both marriages ended in divorce. He died in London.

Works

In Polish
 Wiersze o dzieciństwie (1935)
 Prowincja (1936)
 Po chłopsku (novel, 1941)
 Pokarm cierpki (1943)
 Pogrzeb Europy (1946)
 Piąty poemat (1950)
 Poematy londyńskie i wiersze przedwojenne (Paris, 1965)
 Kula magiczna (1980)
 Poezje wybrane (Warsaw, 1986)
 Modlitwy intelektu (1988)
 Wiersze dobrzyńskie (1994)
 Słowa są bez poręczy (1998)
 Zdobycz i wierność (2018)

Novels in English
The Knotted Cord (1953)
Loot and Loyalty (1955)
Future To Let (1958)
Isolation: a novel in five acts (1959)
The Quick and the Dead (1961)
That Angel Burning at My Left Side (1963)
Inner Circle (1966)
Green Flows the Bile (1969)

Other works in English
 Polish prose and verse (1956)
 Five Centuries of Polish Poetry (1960)
 Polish Literature in its European Context (1962)
 The Other Side of Silence (1970)
 The Third Adam (1975)
 In the scales of fate: an autobiography (1993)
 Metropolitan idyll (1997)
 Polish literature from the European perspective: studies and treaties (2006)

Translations
 Easter vigil and other poems (John Paul II, 1979)
 Collected poems (John Paul II, 1982)
 Poems, letters, drawings (Cyprian Norwid, 2000)
 Roman triptych: meditations (translation of John Paul II's Tryptyk rzymski: medytacje, 2003)

References

1916 births
2007 deaths
Antisemitism in Poland
20th-century Polish novelists
Polish male novelists
Polish translators
Polish expatriates in the United Kingdom
People from Włocławek County
Alumni of the University of St Andrews
20th-century Polish poets
20th-century translators
Polish male poets
Alumni of King's College London
20th-century Polish male writers